Matsunobori Shigeo (20 July 1924 – 21 April 1986) was a sumo wrestler from Matsudo Chiba, Japan. He fought for the now defunct Ōyama stable, joining in 1941. He reached the top makuuchi division in 1951 and made the second highest ōzeki rank (alongside Wakanohana) in 1956, after finishing as a runner-up to Kagamisato in the September 1955 tournament. He was an ōzeki for fifteen tournaments, although he lost the rank at the end of 1958. He retired in November 1961, and in his role as an elder of the Japan Sumo Association he became the head of Ōyama stable in January 1962 upon the death of his old stablemaster, ex-sekiwake Takanobori. He produced one sekitori, the maegashira Daihi, who retired in 1983. Shortly after Ōyama's death in April 1986 the stable was wound up and its two remaining wrestlers retired.

Pre-modern top division record

The New Year tournament began and the Spring tournament returned to Osaka in 1953.

Modern top division record
Since the addition of the Kyushu tournament in 1957 and the Nagoya tournament in 1958, the yearly schedule has remained unchanged.

See also
Glossary of sumo terms
List of past sumo wrestlers
List of ōzeki

References

1924 births
1986 deaths
Japanese sumo wrestlers
People from Matsudo
Sumo people from Chiba Prefecture
Ōzeki